Pembroke College (officially "The Master, Fellows and Scholars of the College or Hall of Valence-Mary") is a constituent college of the University of Cambridge, England. The college is the third-oldest college of the university and has over 700 students and fellows. It is one of the university's larger colleges, with buildings from almost every century since its founding, as well as extensive gardens. Its members are termed "Valencians". The college's current master is Chris Smith, Baron Smith of Finsbury.

Pembroke has a level of academic performance among the highest of all the Cambridge colleges; in 2013, 2014, 2016, and 2018 Pembroke was placed second in the Tompkins Table. Pembroke contains the first chapel designed by Sir Christopher Wren and is one of only six Cambridge colleges to have educated a British prime minister, in Pembroke's case William Pitt the Younger. The college library, with a Victorian neo-gothic clock tower, has an original copy of the first encyclopaedia to contain printed diagrams.

History

Marie de St Pol, Countess of Pembroke (1303–1377), a member of the de Châtillon family of France, founded Pembroke College, Cambridge. On Christmas Eve 1347, Edward III granted Marie de St Pol, widow of the Earl of Pembroke, the licence for the foundation of a new educational establishment in the young university at Cambridge. The Hall of Valence Mary ("Custos & Scolares Aule Valence Marie in Cantebrigg'"), as it was originally known, was thus founded to house a body of students and fellows. The statutes were notable in that they both gave preference to students born in France who had already studied elsewhere in England, and that they required students to report fellow students if they indulged in excessive drinking or visited disreputable houses.

The college was later renamed Pembroke Hall, and finally became Pembroke College in 1856.

Marie was closely involved with College affairs in the 30 years until her death in 1377. She seems to have been something of a disciplinarian: the original Foundation documents had strict penalties for drunkenness and lechery, required that all students' debts were settled within two weeks of the end of term, and gave strict limits on numbers at graduation parties.

In 2015, the college received a bequest of £34 million from the estate of American inventor and Pembroke alumnus Ray Dolby, thought to be the largest single donation to a college in the history of Cambridge University.

Buildings

Old Court

The first buildings comprised a single court (now called Old Court) containing all the component parts of a college – chapel, hall, kitchen and buttery, master's lodgings, students' rooms – and the statutes provided for a manciple, a cook, a barber and a laundress. Both the founding of the college and the building of the city's first college Chapel (1355) required the grant of a papal bull.

The college's gatehouse is the oldest in Cambridge.

Chapel

The original Chapel now forms the Old Library and has a striking seventeenth-century plaster ceiling, designed by Henry Doogood, showing birds flying overhead. Around the Civil War, one of Pembroke's fellows and Chaplain to the future Charles I, Matthew Wren, was imprisoned by Oliver Cromwell. On his release after eighteen years, he fulfilled a promise by hiring his nephew Christopher Wren to build a great Chapel in his former college. The resulting Chapel was consecrated on St Matthew's Day, 1665, and the eastern end was extended by George Gilbert Scott in 1880, when it was consecrated on the Feast of the Annunciation.

Expansion
An increase in membership over the last 150 years saw a corresponding increase in building activity. The Hall was rebuilt in 1875–1876 to designs by Alfred Waterhouse after he had declared the medieval Hall unsafe. As well as the Hall, Waterhouse designed a new range of rooms, Red Buildings (1871–1872), in French Renaissance style, designed a new Master's Lodge on the site of Paschal Yard (1873, later to become N staircase), pulled down the old Lodge and the south range of Old Court to open a vista to the chapel, and finally designed a new Library (1877–1878) in the continental Gothic style. The construction of the new library was undertaken by Rattee and Kett.

Waterhouse was dismissed as architect in 1878 and succeeded by George Gilbert Scott, who, after extending the chapel, provided additional accommodation with the construction of New Court in 1881, with letters on a series of shields along the string course above the first floor spelling out the text from Psalm 127:1,  ("Except the Lord build the house, their labour is but vain that build it").

Building work continued into the 20th century with W. D. Caröe as architect. He added Pitt Building (M staircase) between Ivy Court and Waterhouse's Lodge, and extended New Court with the construction of O staircase on the other side of the Lodge. He linked his two buildings with an arched stone screen, Caröe Bridge, along Pembroke Street in a late Baroque style, the principal function of which was to act as a bridge by which undergraduates might cross the Master's forecourt at first-floor level from Pitt Building to New Court without leaving the college or trespassing in what was then the Fellows' Garden.

In 1926, as the Fellows had become increasingly disenchanted with Waterhouse's Hall, Maurice Webb was brought in to remove the open roof, put in a flat ceiling and add two storeys of sets above. The wall between the Hall and the Fellows' Parlour was taken down, and the latter made into a High Table dais. A new Senior Parlour was then created on the ground floor of Hitcham Building. The remodelling work was completed in 1949 when Murray Easton replaced the Gothic tracery of the windows with a simpler design in the style of the medieval Hall.

In 1933 Maurice Webb built a new Master's Lodge in the south-east corner of the College gardens, on land acquired from Peterhouse in 1861. Following the war, further accommodation was created with the construction in 1957 of Orchard Building, so called because it stands on part of the Foundress's orchard. Finally, in a move to accommodate the majority of junior members on the College site rather than in hostels in the town, in the 1990s Eric Parry designed a new range of buildings on the site of the Master's Lodge, with a new Lodge at the west end.  "Foundress Court" was opened in 1997 in celebration of the college's 650th Anniversary. In 2001 the Library was extended to the east and modified internally.

In 2017, Pembroke College launched a new campaign of extension called the "Time and the place" (or the Mill Lane project), on the other side of Trumpington Street. The project is to enlarge the size of the college by a third, with new social spaces, rooms and offices.

Gardens

Pembroke's enclosed grounds include garden areas. Highlights include "The Orchard" (a patch of semi-wild ground in the centre of the college), an impressive row of Plane Trees and a bowling green, re-turfed in 1996, which is reputed to be among the oldest in continual use in Europe.

Gallery

Coat of arms

The arms of Pembroke College were officially recorded in 1684. The formal blazon combines the arms of De Valence (bars), dimidiated with the arms of St. Pol (vair). It is described as :
Barry of ten argent and azure, an orle of five martlets gules dimidiated with paly vair and gules, on a chief Or a label of five points throughout azure.

Traditions 
Pembroke holds Formal Hall 4 evenings a week depending on their qualifications: a separate Hall is held for BA students. Students of the college must wear gowns and arrive on time for Latin Grace, which starts the dinner. Like many Cambridge colleges, Pembroke also has an annual May Ball.

According to popular legends, Pembroke is inhabited by ghosts occupying the Ivy Court.

Student life 

Pembroke College has both graduate and undergraduate students, termed Valencians, after the college's original name, and its recreational rooms named as "parlours" rather than the more standard "combination room". The undergraduate student body is represented by the Junior Parlour Committee (JPC). The graduate community is represented by the Graduate Parlour Committee (GPC). In March 2016, the Junior Parlour Committee was featured in national newspapers after it cancelled the theme of an "Around The World in 80 Days" dance party.

There are many sports and societies organised by members of the college. Amongst the most established are Pembroke College Boat Club and the Pembroke Players, the college's dramatic society which has been made famous by alumni including Peter Cook, Eric Idle, Tim Brooke-Taylor, Clive James and Bill Oddie, and is now in its 67th year. Pembroke College Association Football Club (PCAFC) and Women's Association Football Club (PCWAFC) compete separately in collegiate competitions. Chrembroke Hockey Club (PCHC) compete jointly with Christ's College, and Pirton RUFC, the rugby union team, are merged with Girton College.

Female undergraduates were first admitted to the college in 1984.

International programmes

Pembroke is the only Cambridge college to have an International Programmes Department, providing opportunities for international students to spend a semester (mid-January to mid-June), or part of the summer, in Cambridge. The Spring Semester Programme is a competitive programme for academically outstanding students who wish to follow a regular Cambridge degree course as fully matriculated members of the University. There are around thirty places each year.

In the summer the college offers the eight-week Pembroke-King's Programme (PKP).  As well as the academic content, trips are made to locales such as London, and the programme has a series of formal halls, which are described as "three-course candlelit meals" serving "interesting" fare in Pembroke's historic dining hall. The Pembroke-King's Programme is also the programme for which the prestigious Thouron Prize is awarded, fully supporting nine American undergraduates from Harvard, Yale, and UPenn.

People associated with Pembroke

Institutions named after the college

Pembroke College in Brown University, the former women's college at Brown University in the United States, was named for the principal building on the women's campus, Pembroke Hall, which was itself named in honour of the Pembroke College (Cambridge) alumnus Roger Williams, a co-founder of Rhode Island.

In 1865 Pembroke College, Cambridge donated land for the formation of the Suffolk memorial to Prince Albert. The land at Framlingham in the county of Suffolk was used to build a school, The Albert Memorial College. The school today is known as Framlingham College and one of its seven houses is named Pembroke House in recognition of the contribution Pembroke College has made to the school.

In 1981, a decade after the merger of Pembroke College into Brown University, the Pembroke Center for Teaching and Research on Women there was named in honour of Pembroke College and the history of women's efforts to gain access to higher education.

See also

:Category:Fellows of Pembroke College, Cambridge
List of organ scholars

References

External links 

 Pembroke College website

 
Christopher Wren buildings
Colleges of the University of Cambridge
1347 establishments in England
Organisations based in Cambridge with royal patronage
Alfred Waterhouse buildings
Grade I listed buildings in Cambridge
Grade I listed educational buildings
Educational institutions established in the 14th century